Louisa Cranstoun Nisbett (1812 – 15 January 1858), English actress, was the daughter of Frederick Hayes Macnamara, an actor, whose stage name was Mordaunt.

As Miss Mordaunt she had considerable experience, especially in Shakespearean leading parts, before her first London appearance in 1829 at Drury Lane as Widow Cheerly in Andrew Cherry's The Soldier's Daughter. Her beauty and high spirits made her at once a popular favourite in a large number of comedy parts, until in 1831 she was married to Captain John Alexander Nisbett and retired. Her husband, however, was killed the same year by a fall from his horse, and she was compelled to reappear on the stage in 1832. She was the original Lady Gay Spanker of London Assurance (1841).

In 1844 she withdrew again from the stage to marry Sir William Boothby, Bart., but on his death (1846), returned to play many parts, including Lady Teazle, Portia, and three dramatic parts created by Knowles: Constantine in The Love Chase and Helen and Julia in The Hunchback. It was as Lady Teazle that she made her final appearance in 1851.

See also
List of entertainers who married titled Britishers

References

1812 births
1858 deaths
English stage actresses
19th-century English actresses
Wives of baronets